Beren and Lúthien is a compilation of multiple versions of the epic fantasy Lúthien and Beren by J. R. R. Tolkien,  one of Tolkien's earliest tales of Middle-earth. It is edited by Christopher Tolkien. It is the story of the love and adventures of the mortal Man Beren and the immortal Elf-maiden Lúthien. Tolkien wrote several versions of their story, the latest in The Silmarillion, and the tale is also mentioned in The Lord of the Rings at the council of Elrond. The story takes place during the First Age of Middle-earth, about 6,500 years before the events of The Hobbit and The Lord of the Rings.

Beren, son of Barahir, cut a Silmaril from Morgoth's crown as the bride price for Lúthien, daughter of the Elf-king Thingol and Melian the Maia. His hand was cut off with a silmaril in it; later he was killed by Carcharoth, the wolf of Angband, but alone of mortal Men returned from the dead.  He lived then with Lúthien on Tol Galen in Ossiriand, and fought the Dwarves at Sarn Athrad. He was the great-grandfather of Elrond and Elros, and thus the ancestor of the Númenórean kings. After the fulfilment of the quest of the silmaril and Beren's death, Lúthien chose to become mortal and to share Beren's fate.

Tolkien found the inspiration for many of the ideas presented in the tale in his love for his wife Edith, and after her death had "Lúthien" engraved on her tombstone, and later "Beren" on his own.

Development and versions

The first version of the story is The Tale of Tinúviel, written in 1917 and published in The Book of Lost Tales. During the 1920s Tolkien started to reshape the tale into an epic poem, The Lay of Leithian. He never finished it, leaving three of seventeen planned cantos unwritten. After his death it was published in The Lays of Beleriand. The latest version of the tale is told in prose form in one chapter of The Silmarillion and is recounted by Aragorn in The Fellowship of the Ring. Some early versions of the story, published in the standalone book in 2017, described Beren as a Noldorin Elf as opposed to a Man.

Publication 

The book was edited by Christopher Tolkien. The story is one of three within The Silmarillion that Tolkien believed warranted their own long-form narratives, the other two being The Children of Húrin and The Fall of Gondolin. The book is illustrated by Alan Lee and edited by Christopher Tolkien, and it features different versions of the story, showing the development of the tale over time. It is restored from Tolkien's manuscripts and presented for the first time as a single more or less continuous narrative, using the ever-evolving materials that make up "The Tale of Beren and Lúthien". It does not contain every version or edit to the story, but those Christopher Tolkien believed would offer the most clarity and minimal explanation:

Approach 

The book starts with the most complete version of the beginning of the tale, "The Tale of Tinúviel" as told in The Book of Lost Tales, with only slight editing of character and place names to avoid confusion with later versions. The general aspect of the story has not been modified; Beren, for example, is a Gnome (Noldo), the son of Egnor bo-Rimion, rather than the human son of Barahir. Beren's heritage switches between elf and man throughout the book, depending on which portion of the story is being told.

As Christopher Tolkien explains:

Further chapters continue the story in through later poems, summaries, and prose, showing how the story evolved over time, in order of the chronology of the story itself (not necessarily the order in which the texts were written or published). These include portions of various versions of "The Lay of Leithian", The Silmarillion, and later chapters of Lost Tales.

Since  J. R. R. Tolkien made many changes to the story, affecting both narrative and style, the presentation in the book is not entirely consistent. There is some overlap of details and discrepancy in continuity, but the sections attempt a complete and continuous story. Christopher Tolkien included editorial explanations and historical details to bridge between sections. Details lost in later accounts were reintroduced: such as Tevildo (who due to the nature of his introduction is treated as a separate character, rather than an early conception of Sauron), Thû the Necromancer (treated as the first appearance of Sauron), the Wicked (or "treacherous") Dwarves (one of The Hobbits references to Lost Tales), and other terminology such as Gnome (Noldoli, later Noldorin Elf), Fay, Fairy, leprechaun, and pixie. Some of these terms appear in early editions of The Hobbit, but were dropped in later writing.

The book offers an "in-universe" perspective for the inconsistencies, as owing to the evolution of the stories told by different perspectives and voices over time, rather than simply reflecting Tolkien's changing ideas over time.

This book reintroduces details that were omitted in the highly edited version of The Silmarillion's "Of the Ruin of Doriath"; it includes the cursed treasure of Mîm, and the fact that Doriath was betrayed from the inside, and that Thingol was able to push the dwarves out of the city, and that he was later killed by an ambush of dwarves. It roughly reconciles the elements of early Lost Tales with details constructed by Guy Kay for the chapter in the Silmarillion, to bring it closer to J.R.R. Tolkien's intention (see The War of the Jewels).

Reception

The Tolkien scholar John Garth, writing in the New Statesman, notes that it took a century for the tale of Beren and Lúthien, mirroring the tale of Second Lieutenant Tolkien watching Edith dancing in a woodland glade far from the "animal horror" of the trenches, to reach publication. Garth finds "much to relish", as the tale changes through "several gears" until finally it "attains a mythic power". Beren's enemy changes from a cat-demon to the "Necromancer" and eventually to Sauron. Garth comments that if this was supposed to be the lost ancestor of the Rapunzel fairytale, then it definitely portrays a modern "female-centred fairy-tale revisioning" with a Lúthien who may be fairer than mortal tongue can tell, but is also more resourceful than her lover.

Notes

References

Primary
This list identifies each item's location in Tolkien's writings.

Secondary

Sources

External links

 The Tale of Beren and Lúthien at theonering.net

Middle-earth books
2017 books
The History of Middle-earth
Fiction about immortality
Literary duos